The 1556 Shaanxi earthquake (Postal romanization: Shensi), known in Chinese colloquially by its regnal year as the Jiajing Great Earthquake "" (Jiājìng Dàdìzhèn) or officially by its epicenter as the Hua County Earthquake "" (Huàxiàn Dìzhèn), occurred in the early morning of 23 January 1556 in Huaxian, Shaanxi during the Ming dynasty.

Most of the residents there lived in yaodongs—artificial caves in loess cliffs—which collapsed and buried alive those sleeping inside. Modern estimates put the direct deaths from the earthquake at over 100,000, while over 700,000 migrated away or died from famine and plagues, which summed up to a total loss of 830,000 people in Imperial records. It was the deadliest recorded earthquake in history, and in turn one of the deadliest natural disasters in Chinese history.

Tectonic setting
Huaxian lies within the Weihe Basin, one of the rift basins that form the southern and eastern boundaries of the Ordos Block. To the east the basin is continuous with the Shanxi Rift System. The Weihe basin formed during the Paleogene in response to northwest–southeast directed extension. Following a tectonically quiet period during the late Paleogene the rift basins became active again in the Neogene in response to NNW–SSE directed extension, activity that continues to the present. The basins in the Weihe-Shanxi Rift System are bounded by large normal faults, which have been responsible for large historical earthquakes. The Weihe Basin has an overall half-graben geometry, with the main controlling faults, such as the Huashan Fault and North Qinling Fault, forming the southern boundary.

Earthquake
The epicenter was in the Wei River Valley in Shaanxi Province, near Huaxian (now Huazhou District of Weinan), Weinan and Huayin. Huaxian was completely destroyed, killing more than half the residents of the city, with an estimated death toll in the hundreds of thousands. The situation in Weinan and Huayin was similar. In certain areas,  crevices opened in the earth. The earthquake also triggered landslides, which contributed to the massive death toll.
The rupture occurred during the reign of the Jiajing Emperor of the Ming dynasty. Therefore, in the Chinese historical record, this earthquake is often referred to as the Jiajing Great Earthquake.

Modern estimates, based on geological data, give the earthquake a magnitude of approximately 8 Mw on the moment magnitude scale and XI (catastrophic damage) on the Mercalli scale, though more recent discoveries have shown that it was more likely 7.9 Mw. While it was the deadliest earthquake and the third-deadliest natural disaster in history, there have been earthquakes with considerably higher magnitudes. Following the earthquake, aftershocks continued several times a month for half a year.

In the annals of China it was described in this manner:

The earthquake damaged many of the Forest of Stone steles badly. Of the 114 Kaicheng Stone Classics, 40 were broken in the earthquake.

The scholar Qin Keda lived through the earthquake and recorded details. One conclusion he drew was that "at the very beginning of an earthquake, people indoors should not go out immediately. Just crouch down and wait. Even if the nest has collapsed, some eggs may remain intact." The shaking reduced the height of the Small Wild Goose Pagoda in Xi'an by three levels.

Loess caves
Millions of people at the time lived in yaodong—artificial loess caves—on high cliffs in the Loess Plateau. Loess is the silty soil, deposited on the plateau by windstorms over ages. The soft loess clay is a result of thousands of years of winds carrying silt from the Gobi Desert into the area. Loess is a highly erosion-prone soil. It is susceptible to the forces of wind and water.

The Loess Plateau and its dusty soil cover almost all of Shanxi, Shaanxi, and Gansu provinces and parts of others. Much of the population lived in yaodongs in these cliffs. This was the major contributing factor to the very high death toll. The earthquake collapsed many caves and caused landslides which destroyed many more.

Affected area
More than 97 counties in the provinces of Shaanxi, Shanxi, Henan, Gansu, Hebei, Shandong, Hubei, Hunan, Jiangsu and Anhui were affected. Buildings were damaged slightly in the cities of Beijing, Chengdu and Shanghai. An  area was destroyed, and in some counties as much as 60% of the population was killed. The cost of damage done by the earthquake is almost impossible to measure in modern terms.

Death toll
Modern estimates put the direct deaths from the earthquake to be probably a little over 100,000, while 730,000 migrated away or died from famine and plagues, which summed up to a total loss of 830,000 people in Imperial records. It is one of the deadliest earthquakes in China, in turn making it one of the top disasters in China by death toll.

Foreign reaction
The Portuguese Dominican friar Gaspar da Cruz, who visited Guangzhou later in 1556, heard about the earthquake, and later reported about it in the last chapter of his book A Treatise of China (1569). He viewed the earthquake as a possible punishment for people's sins, and the Great Comet of 1556 as, possibly, the sign of this calamity (as well as perhaps the sign of the birth of the Antichrist).

See also
List of earthquakes in China
List of disasters in China by death toll
List of historical earthquakes

References

Further reading
.

External links
 Ruins of Hua County Earthquake

1556 Shaanxi
Disasters in Shaanxi
Shaanxi Earthquake, 1556
Shanxi earthquake, 1556
Disasters in Ming dynasty